Christopher Joseph Isaak (born June 26, 1956) is an American singer, songwriter, guitarist and occasional actor. He is widely known for his breakthrough hit and signature song "Wicked Game", as well as songs such as "Blue Hotel", "Baby Did a Bad Bad Thing" and "Somebody's Crying". He is known for his reverb-laden rockabilly revivalist style and wide vocal range. His songs generally focus on the themes of love, loss and heartbreak. With a career spanning four decades, Isaak has released a total of 13 studio albums, toured, and received numerous award nominations. He is often compared to Roy Orbison, Elvis Presley, Ricky Nelson, and Duane Eddy. 

Isaak is closely associated with film director David Lynch, who has used his music in numerous films. As an actor, he's had supporting roles and bit parts in films such as Married to the Mob, The Silence of the Lambs, Little Buddha, That Thing You Do! and Lynch's Twin Peaks: Fire Walk with Me, and starred in two television series: the sitcom The Chris Isaak Show and the talk show The Chris Isaak Hour.

Early life and education 
Isaak was born in Stockton, California, to Dorothy (née Vignolo; 1931–2021), and Joseph "Joe" Isaak (1929–2012), a forklift driver. His father's family is of German descent, and Isaak's mother is of Italian ancestry.

Isaak attended Amos Alonzo Stagg High School in Stockton, graduating in 1974. He was class president all three years, culminating with his election as student body president in his senior year, along with being the 1974 graduating class valedictorian and head of the all-male cheer squad. He subsequently attended a local college, San Joaquin Delta Community College, before transferring to the University of the Pacific, graduating with a bachelor's degree in English and communications arts in 1981.
He was also in an exchange program that allowed him to study in Japan. After graduating from college, Isaak put together his first band, Silvertone. This rockabilly outfit consisted of James Calvin Wilsey (guitar), Rowland Salley (bass), and Kenney Dale Johnson (drums), who remained with Isaak as his permanent backing band.

Career

Music career 
In 1985, Isaak signed a contract with Warner Bros. Records and released his first album, Silvertone, to critical acclaim, including from John Fogerty. The name was taken from the band he formed after graduating college; a reference to the Silvertone guitar brand popularized during the 1950s. The album's sound was raw and diverse, mingling country blues with conventional folk ballads. Although the album was a critical success, it failed to sell respectably. Two tracks from the album, "Gone Ridin'" and "Livin' for Your Lover", featured in David Lynch's 1986 film Blue Velvet.

Isaak's self-titled follow-up album was released in 1987 and managed to scrape into the Billboard 200. The album saw Isaak hone his style to sophisticated R&B. The artwork for Chris Isaak was photographed by fashion photographer Bruce Weber.

Warner Bros. moved Isaak to their Reprise Records label in 1988. That same year, "Suspicion of Love" by Isaak appeared in Married to the Mob, a hit movie starring Matthew Modine, Michelle Pfeiffer, and Dean Stockwell.

Isaak's best known song is "Wicked Game". In an interview with Mark Needham, an engineer who worked with Isaak on "Wicked Game", Needham claimed that it took several years to put the track together. It was first released on the 1989 album Heart Shaped World, and an instrumental version of the song was subsequently featured in the 1990 David Lynch film Wild at Heart. Lee Chesnut, an Atlanta radio station music director who was obsessed with Lynch films, played the vocal version and it became the station's most-requested song. Chesnut spread the word to other radio stations and the single became a national top 10 hit in February 1991, peaking at number 6. It also reached No. 10 in the UK Singles Chart. The music video for the song was directed by Herb Ritts and was an MTV and VH1 hit; shot in black and white, it featured Isaak and supermodel Helena Christensen in a sensual encounter on the beach, caressing each other and whispering in each other's ears. Another less-seen version of "Wicked Game" is directed by David Lynch and comprises scenes from the film Wild at Heart. "Wicked Game" featured as the backing music in the 2001 TV advertisement for the Jaguar X-Type in the UK.

"Two Hearts" from Isaak's fourth album, San Francisco Days, was featured in the closing credits of True Romance, a 1993 film directed by Tony Scott, written by Quentin Tarantino, and starring Christian Slater and Patricia Arquette.

In 1995, Isaak split with longtime guitarist James Calvin Wilsey. That year he released Forever Blue, Isaak's fifth album, and the accompanying tour featured Hershel Yatovitz on guitar. The album was nominated for a Grammy for Best Rock Album, and the single "Somebody's Crying" was nominated for a Grammy for Best Male Rock Vocal Performance. On March 15, 1996, the album was certified Platinum by the RIAA. "Baby Did a Bad Bad Thing" was featured in Stanley Kubrick's final film, Eyes Wide Shut, in 1999. The music video for the song was directed by Herb Ritts (his second collaboration with Isaak); it was shot in color and featured Isaak and French supermodel Laetitia Casta in a motel room.

Isaak composed a theme song for U.S. late-night television variety-talk show The Late Late Show with Craig Kilborn.

The record producer Erik Jacobsen was instrumental in Isaak's sound for 15 years. Jacobsen is known for his production work with The Lovin' Spoonful, as well as on solo albums by Spoonful's John Sebastian and Jerry Yester. Isaak ceased working with Jacobsen on his 2002 album Always Got Tonight. "Life Will Go On" from this album was featured in Chasing Liberty, a 2004 film starring Mandy Moore and Matthew Goode.

In 2007, a live performance of Isaak singing Fats Domino's hit "Blueberry Hill" with Johnny Hallyday at La Cigale was released on Hallyday's live album La Cigale : 12-17 Décembre 2006. At the end of this recording, one can hear Isaak thanking the French rock-'n'-roll star, referring to him as "The King". Also in 2007, Isaak opened for Stevie Nicks on the first leg of her Crystal Visions Tour.

For his 2009 album Mr. Lucky, Isaak collaborated with producer John Shanks.

Isaak contributed a cover of Buddy Holly's "Crying, Waiting, Hoping" for a tribute album, Listen to Me: Buddy Holly, released in September 2011. The next month, he released Beyond the Sun, an album of cover songs (except for one original) that was recorded in Memphis, Tennessee, at the Sun Records studio.

Isaak performed at the 2015 AFL Grand Final, along with English singer Ellie Goulding and Canadian musician Bryan Adams.

In 2016, Isaak did the "First Comes the Night Tour".

Guitars 
Isaak revealed in a 2002 interview with Acoustic Guitar that he uses a one-of-a-kind Gibson:

Isaak also plays a Gibson J-200 acoustic guitar, which he uses for songwriting.

Acting and other work 
In addition to his work as a musician, Isaak has appeared in numerous feature films and television shows as an actor, sometimes as a main character, but mostly playing smaller roles. A few of his larger parts in films were in David Lynch's Twin Peaks: Fire Walk with Me in 1992 and in the 1993 Bernardo Bertolucci-directed Little Buddha, in which he starred alongside Bridget Fonda and Keanu Reeves. Some other motion pictures featuring Isaak include Married to the Mob (1988), The Silence of the Lambs (1991), That Thing You Do! (1996), A Dirty Shame (2004), and The Informers (2008).

Isaak guest-starred in the special Super Bowl XXX edition of the television sitcom Friends ("The One After the Superbowl, Part One") in 1996, and in 1998 he co-starred in the HBO miniseries From the Earth to the Moon as astronaut Ed White, who was the first American astronaut to do a spacewalk and who died in the 1967 Apollo 1 fire.

From March 2001 to March 2004, Isaak starred in his own television show, The Chris Isaak Show. It aired in the United States on the cable television network Showtime. This adult sitcom featured Isaak and his band playing themselves, and the episode plots were based on fictional accounts of the backstage world of Isaak—the rock star next door.

In 2009, The Biography Channel aired The Chris Isaak Hour, a one-hour music interview and performance show hosted by Isaak. The series premiere featured Trisha Yearwood and included their first-ever performance of "Breaking Apart", a song from Isaak's 1998 album Speak of the Devil that the two recorded as a duet for his 2009 album Mr. Lucky. The guests on the remaining seven episodes of the series were: Stevie Nicks, Glen Campbell, Michael Bublé, Chicago, The Smashing Pumpkins, Yusuf Islam, and Jewel.

In April 2010, Isaak was the special guest during Conan O'Brien's The Legally Prohibited from Being Funny on Television Tour performance at the Nob Hill Masonic Center in San Francisco, California.

On September 29, 2011, Isaak received the Stockton Arts Commission STAR Award in his hometown of Stockton, California.

In 2014, Isaak voiced the character of Enoch, the apparent ruler of the town of Pottsfield, in the second episode of the animated television miniseries Over the Garden Wall.

On May 3, 2015, Isaak was confirmed to be replacing Natalie Bassingthwaighte as a judge on the seventh season of The X Factor Australia. He joined James Blunt and returning judges Guy Sebastian and Dannii Minogue.

Discography 

Silvertone (1985)
Chris Isaak (1987)
Heart Shaped World (1989)
San Francisco Days (1993)
Forever Blue (1995)
Baja Sessions (1996)
Speak of the Devil (1998)
Always Got Tonight (2002)
Christmas (2004)
Mr. Lucky (2009)
Beyond the Sun (2011)
First Comes the Night (2015)
Everybody Knows It's Christmas  (2022)

Filmography

Film 
Married to the Mob – 'The Clown' (1988)
The Silence of the Lambs – SWAT Commander (1991)
Twin Peaks: Fire Walk with Me – Special Agent Chester Desmond (1992)
Little Buddha – Dean Conrad (1993)
That Thing You Do! – Uncle Bob (1996)
Grace of My Heart - Mathew Lewis (1996)
A Dirty Shame – Vaughn Stickles (2004)
The Informers – Les (2008)

Television 
 Wiseguy – Berated lounge singer (1987)
 The Larry Sanders Show - Himself (season 4, episode 6, 1995 - The P.A.)
 Friends – Rob Donnan (season 2, episode 12, 1996 – "The One After the Superbowl")
 From the Earth to the Moon – Astronaut Edward White II (1998)
 Melrose Place – Himself/musical guest (season 7, episode 28, 1998 – Ryan's Choice)
 The Late Late Show with Craig Kilborn – Himself (season 3, episode 40, June 29, 2001)
 The Greatest – Himself (50 Sexiest Video Moments, 2003)
 Ed – Jamie Decker (season 3, episode 20, 2003 – "Second Chances")
 The Greatest – Himself/host (100 Greatest Videos, 2003)
 The Chris Isaak Show – Himself (2001–2004)
 American Dreams – Roy Orbison (season 2, episode 14, 2004 – "Old Enough to Fight")
 The Footy Show – Himself (Grand Final, 2004)
 The Late Late Show with Craig Ferguson – Michael Caine in Space (season 2, episode 177, 2006)
 Great Performances Jerry Lee Lewis: Last Man Standing Live – Himself (2007)
 The Bill Engvall Show – Himself (season 1, episode 6, 2007)
 Australian Idol – Himself (season 6, November 9–10, 2008)
 The Chris Isaak Hour – Himself/host (2009)
 George Stroumboulopoulos Tonight – Himself (season 2, episode 23, 2011)
 Conan – Himself (episode 192, January 4, 2012)
 Loose Women – Himself (September 28, 2012)
 The Tonight Show – Himself (January 13, 2014)
 Hot in Cleveland – Chase Jackson (one episode, 2014)
 Over the Garden Wall – Enoch (one episode, 2014)
 Adventure Time – 7718 (one episode, 2015)
 The X Factor Australia – Himself – Judge/Mentor (2015)
 Sheriff Callie's Wild West – Johnny Strum (voice) (season 2, 2016)

Music video 
 Elton John – "Sacrifice"  – Man (1989)

Awards and nominations 
{| class=wikitable
|-
! Year !! Awards !! Work !! Category !! Result
|-
| rowspan="2" | 1985
| rowspan="9" | MTV Video Music Awards
| rowspan="2" | "Dancin'"
| Most Experimental Video
| 
|-
| Best Direction in a Video
| 
|-
| rowspan="8" | 1991
| rowspan="7" | "Wicked Game"
| Video of the Year
| 
|-
| Best Direction in a Video
| 
|-
| Viewer's Choice
| 
|-
| Best Editing in a Video
| 
|-
| Best Male Video
| 
|-
| Best Cinematography in a Video
| 
|-
| Best Video from a Film
| 
|-
| Pollstar Concert Industry Awards
| Tour
| Small Hall Tour of the Year
| 
|-
| rowspan=2|1992
| ASCAP Pop Music Awards
| "Wicked Game"
| Most Performed Song
| 
|-
| Brit Awards
| rowspan="2" | Himself
| Best International Breakthrough
| 
|-
| rowspan="3" | 1995
| Music Television Awards
| Best Male
| 
|-
| Razzie Awards
| Little Buddha
| Worst New Star
| 
|-
| MTV Video Music Awards
| rowspan="2" | "Somebody's Crying"
| Best Male Video
| 
|-
| rowspan="6" | 1996
| rowspan="2" | Grammy Awards
| Best Male Rock Vocal Performance
| 
|-
| rowspan="2" | Forever Blue
| Best Rock Album
| 
|-
| rowspan="5" | California Music Awards
| Outstanding Album
| 
|-
| rowspan="2" | Himself
| Outstanding Male Vocalist
| 
|-
| Bay Area Musician of the Year
| 
|-
| Himself & Silvertone
| Outstanding Group
| 
|-
| rowspan="2"|1999
| Himself
| Outstanding Male Vocalist
| 
|-
| MVPA Awards
| "Please"
| Best Adult Contemporary Video
| 
|-
| 2000
| Online Film & Television Association Awards
| "Baby Did a Bad Bad Thing"
| Best Adapted Song
| 
|-
| 2001
| Television Critics' Association Awards
| The Chris Isaak Show
| Individual Achievement in Comedy
| 
|-
| 2003
| MVPA Awards
| rowspan="2" | "Wicked Game"
| MVPA Hall of Fame
| 
|-
| 2004
| ASCAP Film & TV Awards
| Most Performed Theme
| 
|-
| 2022
| Americana Music Honors & Awards
| Himself
| Lifetime Achievement Award for Performance
|

References

External links 

Chris Isaak.com, official site of Chris Isaak

Chris Isaak at Recordnet.com: Page with stories, multimedia and more about Chris Isaak from The Record in Stockon, CA, Isaak's hometown.

Chris Isaak concert history

1956 births
American male singer-songwriters
American rockabilly guitarists
American soft rock musicians
Male actors from California
American people of German-Russian descent
American people of Italian descent
American expatriates in Australia
Living people
Musicians from Stockton, California
University of the Pacific (United States) alumni
Warner Records artists
20th-century American male actors
21st-century American male actors
American male film actors
20th-century American guitarists
21st-century American guitarists
Singer-songwriters from California
Guitarists from California
American male guitarists
20th-century American male musicians
21st-century American male musicians
Vanguard Records artists